Ian Miller (born 13 May 1955) is a Scottish former footballer who played his football in England as a winger. He made 660 league and cup appearances in the English Football League over an eighteen-year professional career, scoring 48 goals.

He began his career at Bury, helping the club to win promotion out of the Fourth Division in 1973–74. He was then at Nottingham Forest, but did not feature for the first team before transferring to Doncaster Rovers in 1975. Voted onto the Fourth Division PFA Team of the Year in 1975–76, 1976–77 and 1977–78, he moved on to Swindon Town in 1978. He switched to Blackburn Rovers in 1981, and spent the next eight years with the club, lifting the Full Members Cup in 1987. He then had brief spells with Port Vale and Scunthorpe United, before ending his career with non-league Stafford Rangers. He went into coaching straight after his retirement as a player, and worked behind the scenes at a wide variety of clubs in the Football League.

Playing career

Bury
Miller started his career with Scottish junior club Jeanfield Swifts, before turning professional with English club Bury in 1973. The "Shakers" won promotion out of the Fourth Division in 1973–74, with manager Bobby Smith playing Miller in fifteen league games.

Nottingham Forest to Doncaster Rovers
Miller then moved on to Nottingham Forest of the Second Division, then led by Allan Brown. He failed to play a league game for Forest in 1974–75, and instead moved on to Doncaster Rovers in a player exchange for Micky French in July 1978, who were in the Fourth Division and managed by Stan Anderson. He provided many assists for strike duo Peter Kitchen and Brendan O'Callaghan in the 1975–76, also scoring nine goals himself, including a hat-trick in a 5–1 win over Newport County in November. He played a total of 139 games for "Donny" in league and cup competitions, scoring 15 goals, as the side posted mid-table finishes in 1976–77 and 1977–78. He was voted onto the PFA Team of the Year for the fourth tier in all three of his seasons at Belle Vue as his accurate crosses provided a huge amount of goalscoring chances for Kitchen and O'Callaghan.

Swindon Town
He was transferred to Third Division club Swindon Town in exchange for Mick French, in a move that reunited him with manager Bobby Smith. He was signed to provide crosses for Andy Rowland and Alan Mayes. The "Robins" declined from fifth in 1978–79 to tenth in 1979–80 and then seventeenth in 1980–81 – just one point above the relegation zone. He played 159 games for Swindon in all competitions, scoring 14 goals.

Blackburn Rovers
Miller then signed with Second Division Blackburn Rovers, then managed by Bobby Saxton, who authorised a £60,000 fee. He went on to become a popular player with the club's fans. Rovers finished in the top-half of the table in 1981–82, 1982–83 and 1983–84, before missing out on promotion to the First Division by just one point in 1984–85. However they then plummeted in 1985–86, avoiding relegation by just three points. Saxton was replaced by Don Mackay halfway through the 1986–87 campaign. Rovers also won the Full Members Cup in 1987, as they beat Charlton Athletic 1–0 in the Wembley final after Miller set up Colin Hendry for the only goal of the game. He then led them to a play-off finish in 1987–88, though Rovers lost to Chelsea at the semi-final stage. They then reached the play-off final in 1988–89, but lost out to Crystal Palace 4–3 over the course of two legs.

Later career
Miller departed Ewood Park and joined Second Division Port Vale in June 1989, as manager John Rudge needed cover for an injured Gary Ford. He began the 1989–90 season as a regular, but lost his place by December and was released in August 1990, having played 24 games in all competitions, scoring once against Ipswich Town on New Year's Day. He moved on to Mick Buxton's Scunthorpe United, and helped them to the Fourth Division play-offs, where they lost to Blackpool at the semi-final stage. Miller then ended his career with Stafford Rangers in the Conference.

Style of play
Miller was a pacey right-winger with good dribbling and erratic crossing abilities, as well as a high defensive work rate.

Coaching career
Miller remained active in the game after retiring as a player. He returned to Port Vale as the Community Programme leader in August 1991 and became the youth development officer in May 1992. In November 1994 he left Vale Park to become the reserve team coach at Wolverhampton Wanderers. He later coached at Blackburn Rovers, Blackpool (assisting Colin Hendry), Bury, Leicester City and Manchester City before joining the staff at Leeds United in 2008. On 1 February 2012, chairman Ken Bates sacked manager Simon Grayson, his assistant Glynn Snodin, and Miller. He followed Grayson on to Huddersfield Town the next month, and later went with him to Preston North End and Sunderland. He also joined Grayson at Blackpool in July 2019, marking a return to Bloomfield Road after fourteen years. He left the club, along with Grayson, on 12 February 2020.

Career statistics
Source:

A.  The "Other" column constitutes appearances and goals in the League Cup, League Trophy, Football League play-offs and Full Members Cup.

Honours
Individual
PFA Fourth Division Team of the Year: 1975–76, 1976–77 & 1977–78

Bury
Football League Fourth Division promotion: 1973–74

Blackburn Rovers
Full Members Cup: 1987

References

1955 births
Living people
Footballers from Perth, Scotland
Scottish footballers
Association football midfielders
Jeanfield Swifts F.C. players
Bury F.C. players
Nottingham Forest F.C. players
Doncaster Rovers F.C. players
Swindon Town F.C. players
Blackburn Rovers F.C. players
Port Vale F.C. players
Scunthorpe United F.C. players
Stafford Rangers F.C. players
English Football League players
National League (English football) players
Scottish Junior Football Association players
Association football coaches
Port Vale F.C. non-playing staff
Blackburn Rovers F.C. non-playing staff
Blackpool F.C. non-playing staff
Bury F.C. non-playing staff
Leeds United F.C. non-playing staff
Leicester City F.C. non-playing staff
Manchester City F.C. non-playing staff
Wolverhampton Wanderers F.C. non-playing staff
Huddersfield Town A.F.C. non-playing staff
Preston North End F.C. non-playing staff
Sunderland A.F.C. non-playing staff